is a Japanese footballer currently playing as a defender for Fujieda MYFC.

Career

Youth Career
Suzuki began youth career in Shimizu S-Pulse until 2014, joined with Tokyo Gakugei University from 2015 until 2018.

Senior Career
In 2019, Suzuki joined J3 League side, Fujieda MYFC. In 2021, Suzuki debut play with Fujieda MYFC.

Club statistics
.

Notes

References

External links

1996 births
Living people
Japanese footballers
Association football defenders
J3 League players
Shimizu S-Pulse players
Fujieda MYFC players
People from Fujieda, Shizuoka